The DKW F5 is a sub compact front wheel drive saloon launched by Auto Union's DKW division in 1935 as a replacement for the DKWs F4 (Meisterklasse) and F2 (Reichsklasse) models.

The body
The appearance of the F5 was little changed from those of the F2 and F4. However, the timber-frame construction of the central portion of the body was, in the F5, replaced with a steel frame. The outer skin of the body remained of fabric construction, with plywood support.

There were two broadly similar F5 saloons, sold as the Reichsklasse and Meisterklasse. They shared the same track and wheelbase, but the Meisterklasse was 3.5 cm longer.

Engine and running gear
The cars had the two-cylinder two-stroke engines of their predecessors.

DKW had been producing small front wheel drive sedans since 1931. The incorporation of front wheel drive in the F5 was at this time still strikingly innovative in terms of the wider auto market, however.

The car featured a three-speed manual transmission system.

Commercial
Production of the F5 saloon ended in 1936 while production of the  cabriolet versions continued for a further year. The car was replaced by the DKW F7. By the time that happened, approximately 60,000 F5s had been produced, placing this car among Germany's top sellers.

Data

Sources

F5
Compact cars
Front-wheel-drive vehicles
1930s cars
Cars introduced in 1935